The Czechoslovak Basketball League (abbreviation CSBL) was the highest level professional club basketball competition for men in Czechoslovakia. Its successor national league in the Czech Republic became the Mattoni NBL, and its successor national league in Slovakia became the Extraliga.

History 
 1929–30 to 1938–39  Provincial League of Bohemia and Moravia
 1939–40 to 1944–45  Provincial League of Protectorate
 1945–46 to 1992–93  Czechoslovak Basketball League

Title holders 

 1929–30 YMCA Praha
 1931 YMCA Praha
 1932 YMCA Praha
 1932–33 YMCA Praha
 1933–34 YMCA Praha
 1934–35 YMCA Praha
 1935–36 YMCA Praha
 1936–37 Uncas Praha
 1937–38 Uncas Praha
 1938–39 Královo Pole Brno
 1939–40 Sparta Praha
 1940–41 Sokol Praha
 1941–42 Brno Žabovřesky
 1942–43 Brno Žabovřesky
 1943–44 Uncas Praha
 1944–45 Uncas Praha
 1945–46 Sokol I Brno
 1946–47 Uncas Praha
 1947 Sokol I Brno 
 1947–48 Sokol I Brno 
 1948 Sokol I Brno 
 1948–49 Sokol I Brno 
 1949–50 Sokol I Brno 
 1950–51 Sokol I Brno 
 1951 Spartak ZJŠ Brno 
 1952 Slavia Brno
 1953 Slavia Brno
 1953–54 ÚDA Praha
 1954–55 ÚDA Praha
 1955–56 ÚDA Praha
 1956–57 Slovan Orbis Praha
 1957–58 Spartak ZJŠ Brno 
 1958–59 Slovan Orbis Praha
 1959–60 Spartak Praha Sokolovo
 1960–61 Iskra Svit
 1961–62 Spartak ZJŠ Brno
 1962–63 Spartak ZJŠ Brno 
 1963–64 Spartak ZJŠ Brno
 1964–65 Slavia VŠ Praha
 1965–66 Slavia VŠ Praha
 1966–67 Spartak ZJŠ Brno 
 1967–68 Spartak ZJŠ Brno 
 1968–69 Slavia VŠ Praha
 1969–70 Slavia VŠ Praha
 1970–71 Slavia VŠ Praha
 1971–72 Slavia VŠ Praha
 1972–73 Dukla Olomouc
 1973–74 Slavia VŠ Praha
 1974–75 Dukla Olomouc
 1975–76 Spartak ZJŠ Brno 
 1976–77 Spartak-Zbrojovka Brno
 1977–78 Zbrojovka Brno 
 1978–79 Inter Slovnaft
 1979–80 Inter Slovnaft 
 1980–81 Slavia VŠ Praha
 1981–82 Slavia VŠ Praha
 1982–83 Inter Slovnaft 
 1983–84 Rudá hvězda Pardubice
 1984–85 Inter Slovnaft 
 1985–86 Zbrojovka Brno 
 1986–87 Zbrojovka Brno 
 1987–88 Zbrojovka Brno 
 1988–89 Baník Cigel' Prievidza 
 1989–90 Zbrojovka Brno 
 1990–91 VŠ Praha
 1991–92 USK Praha
 1992–93 Baník Cigel' Prievidza

Performance by club

Performance by province

Playoff Finals

Historical players

Jiří Zídek Sr.
Kamil Brabenec
Jan Bobrovský
Zdeněk Douša
Gustáv Hraška
Jaroslav Skála
Jiří Zedníček
Stanislav Kropilák
Jiří Pospíšil
Vlastimil Havlík
Vojtěch Petr
Zdeněk Kos
Vladimír Padrta
Dušan Lukášik
František Konvička
Vlastibor Klimeš 
Jan Blažek
Peter Rajniak
Jaroslav Kantůrek 
Jiří Růžička
Oto Matický 
Justin Sedlák
Robert Mifka
Pavol Bojanovský
Leoš Krejčí
Vladimír Ptáček
Dušan Žáček
Jaroslav Tetiva
Jiří Okáč
Jiří Ammer
Boris Lukášik
Igor Vraniak
Bohumil Tomášek
Jaroslav Kovář
Petr Novický
Vladimír Pištělák
Zdeněk Böhm
Josef Jelínek
Jan Svoboda
Petr Czudek
Richard Petruška
Štefan Svitek
Ivan Mrázek
Jiří Baumruk
Jaroslav Šíp
Ladislav Trpkoš
Miroslav Škeřík
Zdeněk Bobrovský
Emil Velenský
Jiří "George" Zídek Jr.
Jan Kozák
Josef Ezr
Zdeněk Rylich
Juraj Žuffa
Karel Baroch
Milan Voračka
Jiří Konopásek
Jaroslav Křivý
Jozef Michalko
Vladimír Vyoral
Michal Ježdík
Václav Hrubý
Pavel Bečka
Stanislav Kameník
Marian Kotleba
Ivan Chrenka
Peter Chrenka
Marek Andruška

Czechoslovak basketball clubs in European and worldwide competitions

Czechoslovak basketball awards

Czechoslovak Basketball League statistical leaders

See also
Czech Republic Basketball League
Slovakian Basketball League
 

Basketball in Czechoslovakia
Defunct basketball leagues in Europe
Sports leagues in Czechoslovakia
1929 establishments in Czechoslovakia
1993 disestablishments in the Czech Republic
1993 disestablishments in Slovakia